Ralegan Therpal is a village in Parner taluka in Ahmednagar district of state of Maharashtra, India. The village is about 12 km from Shirur.

This village is known for the Karkhile's. This village is generally misunderstood with the Ralegan siddhi. Both the villages are located in parner taluka.

Religion
The majority of the population  in the village is Hindu. There are various famous temples in the village. Hanuman mandir, Shiva temple and Biroba temple and sant savtamali mandir are few of them.

Economy
The majority of the population has farming as their primary occupation. Major crops are Sugar cane, Bajara, Onion, Wheat. Horticulture crops like pomegranate, oranges, sweet oranges, Banana, vegetables and various kinds of flowers are becoming popular nowadays.

Education
There is Zhila Parisad primary school(Marathi Shala) up to 7th standard in the village. Secondary education is available in secondary highschool up to 10th standard. For further education students have to commute to nearby town mainly Shirur.

Festivals
Gramdaivat "BIROBA" chi Yatra celebrated on every Magh Pournima. Ralegan Therpal's villager also celebrated  "Sayyid Babachi Yatra"

See also
 Parner taluka
 Villages in Parner taluka

References 

Villages in Parner taluka
Villages in Ahmednagar district